Inside is the eighth album by Vancouver-based indie rock band Mother Mother, released on June 25, 2021. It was produced by Ryan Guldemond and Howard Redekopp. It is a concept album dealing with themes of isolation and self-love during the COVID-19 pandemic.

On December 1, 2021, Mother Mother announced a deluxe edition of Inside, which would include a sequel to "Hayloft" titled "Hayloft II." The deluxe was released on January 28, 2022.

Background and recording 
The band intended for 2020 to be a hiatus year, but decided to write an album during the COVID-19 pandemic lockdown. In an interview, Ryan Guldemond said "It's an album that we could only make once, during a very unique time in the world, and a focused response to that moment ... it’s an important album in our discography. I'm really happy we had the opportunity to chronicle this time in the world with a body of work." Ideas for the album were shared over phone calls and e-mail and members would record in the studio alone due to Canada's COVID-19 restrictions.

Guldemond states that the album was inspired by the time he spent isolated by the pandemic, wanting to theme the lyrics around "going within to understand oneself better, to be better." The album's title refers to both Canada's stay-at-home orders and "going inside of oneself." Guldemond imagined a fusion of industrial and dystopian sounds combined with alternative and indie rock. While beginning to write the album, Guldemond took voice notes during his walks, including the audio of Vancouver's 7:00 p.m. healthcare salute included in the first, second, and final songs of the album.

The band considers Inside a continuation of their 2018 album, Dance and Cry.

Track listing

Personnel
Ryan Guldemond – guitar and vocals
Molly Guldemond – vocals and synth
Jasmin Parkin – keyboard and vocals
Ali Siadat – drums
Mike Young – bass

Charts

Singles

References

Mother Mother albums
2021 albums
Concept albums